The 1868 Wareham by-election was fought on 23 December 1868.  The by-election was fought due to the death of the incumbent MP of the Liberal Party, John Calcraft.  It was won by the Conservative candidate John Erle-Drax.

Result

References

1868 elections in the United Kingdom
1868 in England
19th century in Dorset
December 1868 events
Purbeck District
By-elections to the Parliament of the United Kingdom in Dorset constituencies